Legendary bird may refer to

 Any bird that appears in legends, mythology, and religion
:Category:Legendary birds
:Category:Birds in mythology
 Articuno, Zapdos, and Moltres from the Pokémon series